Staphylinochrous longipennis is a species of moth of the Anomoeotidae family. It is found in Africa.

References

Anomoeotidae